AIDS Research and Therapy is a peer-reviewed open access medical journal covering research on HIV/AIDS. It was established in 2004 and is published by BioMed Central. The editors-in-chief are Eric Arts (University of Western Ontario) and Mark Boyd (Kirby Institute). According to the Journal Citation Reports, the journal has a 2017 impact factor of 2.357.

References

External links

Publications established in 2004
BioMed Central academic journals
HIV/AIDS journals
English-language journals